Epiphyas lycodes is a species of moth of the family Tortricidae. It is found in Australia, where it has been recorded from Tasmania. The habitat consists of open subalpine forests.

References

Moths described in 1910
Epiphyas